Kacper Gach (born 11 July 1998) is a Polish professional footballer who plays as a left-back.

References

1998 births
Living people
People from Żywiec
Polish footballers
Association football fullbacks
I liga players
III liga players
Ekstraklasa players
Podbeskidzie Bielsko-Biała players
Widzew Łódź players
Sandecja Nowy Sącz players